No Flesh Creek is a stream in the U.S. state of South Dakota.

Some say No Flesh Creek has the name of Chief No Flesh, a Sioux Indian, while others believe the creek was named after the Indians' starving horses.

See also
List of rivers of South Dakota

References

Rivers of Bennett County, South Dakota
Rivers of Jackson County, South Dakota
Rivers of Oglala Lakota County, South Dakota
Rivers of South Dakota